45 Draconis is a single star located in the northern circumpolar constellation of Draco, around 3,500 light years from the Earth. 45 Draconis is the Flamsteed designation, while it has the Bayer designation of d Draconis. This object is visible to the naked eye as a faint, yellow-white hued star with an apparent visual magnitude of 4.78. Radial velocity measurements indicate it is moving closer to the Sun at the rate of −12.5 km/s.

Lyubimkov et al. (2012) assigned this star a stellar classification of F7Ib, matching an F-type supergiant. It is approximately 33 million years old with 8.2 times the mass of the Sun and about 62 times the Sun's radius. The star is radiating 5,450 times the Sun's luminosity from its photosphere at an effective temperature of 6,151 K.

References

F-type supergiants
Draco (constellation)
Draconis, d
BD+56 2113
Draconis, 45
171635
090905
6978